Riner Historic District is a national historic district located at Riner, Montgomery County, Virginia.  The district encompasses 23 contributing buildings and 1 contributing structure in the village of Riner. It includes a variety of vernacular residential, commercial, and institutional buildings dating from the 1850s to 1920s. Notable buildings include the Methodist Episcopal Church (1908), Bank of Riner (1912–1913), Jonathan E. Hall House / Store, Kinsey-Lawrence House (1908–1909), Dr. Stone Farm, Surface Mill (c. 1910), Auburn United Methodist Church (1885), and Sam Barnett Store.

It was listed on the National Register of Historic Places in 1991.

References

Historic districts in Montgomery County, Virginia
Greek Revival architecture in Virginia
National Register of Historic Places in Montgomery County, Virginia
Historic districts on the National Register of Historic Places in Virginia